Magdeburg rights (also called Magdeburg Law) were a set of town privileges first developed by Otto I, Holy Roman Emperor (936–973) and based on the Flemish Law, which regulated the degree of internal autonomy within cities and villages granted by the local ruler. Named after the German city of Magdeburg, these town charters were perhaps the most important set of medieval laws in Central Europe. They became the basis for the German town laws developed during many centuries in the Holy Roman Empire.  The Magdeburg rights were adopted and adapted by numerous monarchs, including the rulers of Bohemia, Hungary, Poland and Lithuania, a milestone in the urbanization of the region which prompted the development of thousands of villages and cities.

Provisions

Being a member of the Hanseatic League, Magdeburg was one of the most important trade cities, maintaining commerce with the Low Countries, the Baltic states, and the interior (for example Braunschweig). As with most medieval city laws, the rights were primarily targeted at regulating trade to the benefit of the local merchants and artisans, who formed the most important part of the population of many such cities. External merchants coming into the city were not allowed to trade on their own, but instead forced to sell the goods they had brought into the city to local traders, if any wished to buy them.

Jews and Germans were sometimes competitors in those cities. Jews lived under privileges that they carefully negotiated with the king or emperor. They were not subject to city jurisdiction. These privileges guaranteed that they could maintain communal autonomy, live according to their laws, and be subjected directly to the royal jurisdiction in matters concerning Jews and Christians. One of the provisions granted to Jews was that a Jew could not be compelled to be a Gewährsmann/informant; that is, he had the right to keep confidential how he had acquired objects in his possession. A Jew with this right could voluntarily divulge who had gifted, sold, or loaned him the object, but it was illegal to coerce him to say. Other provisions frequently mentioned were a permission to sell meat to Christians, or employ Christian servants. By at least some contemporary observers, the parallel infrastructure of Jews and gentiles was considered significant; in medieval Poland's royal city development policy, both German merchants and Jews were invited to settle in Polish cities.

Spread of the law

Among the most advanced systems of old Germanic law of the time, in the 13th and 14th centuries, Magdeburg rights were granted to more than a hundred cities, in Central Europe apart from Germany, including Schleswig, Bohemia, Poland, Belarus, Ukraine, especially in Pomerania, Prussia, the Grand Duchy of Lithuania (following the Christianization of Lithuania), and probably Moldavia. In these lands they were mostly known as German or Teutonic law. Since the local tribunal of Magdeburg also became the superior court for these towns, Magdeburg, together with Lübeck, practically defined the law of northern Germany, Poland and Lithuania for centuries, being the heart of the most important "family" of city laws. This role remained until the old Germanic laws were successively replaced with Roman law under the influence of the Reichskammergericht, in the centuries after its establishment during the Imperial Reform of 1495.

Implementation across Europe
The Law of Magdeburg implemented in Poland was different from its original German form. It was combined with a set of civil and criminal laws, and adjusted to include the urban planning popular across Western Europe – which was based (more or less) on the ancient Roman model. Polish land owners used the location privilege known as "settlement with German law" across the country, even if there was no significant number of German settlers. Meanwhile, country people often ignorant of the actual German text, practiced the old common law of Poland in private relations.

Notable Polish, Lithuanian, Belarusian and Ukrainian towns formerly governed on the basis of the location privilege known as the "settlement with German law" issued by Polish and Grand Duchy of Lithuania landlords (since the 16th to 18th centuries by Polish–Lithuanian Commonwealth landlords) include Biecz, Frysztak, Sandomierz, Kraków, Kurów, Minsk, Polotsk, Poznań, Ropczyce, Łódź, Wrocław, Szczecin (which was not a part of Poland when granted town rights; they were given by a Pomeranian landlord), Złotoryja, Vilnius, Trakai, Kaunas, Hrodna, Kyiv, Lviv, Chernivtsi, Brody, Lutsk, Volodymyr, Sanok, Sniatyn, Nizhyn and many hundreds of others. The advantages were not only economic, but also political. Members of noble families were able to join the city patriciate usually unchallenged. In the medieval Kingdom of Hungary, the first town to receive the Magdeburg rights was Goldberg in 1211 (Latin: "Aurum"; Polish: "Złotoryja"), then Székesfehérvár in 1237, followed by Trnava (1238), Nitra (1248), Levoča (1271) and Žilina (1369). Towns and cities including Bardejov, Buda, Bratislava and Košice adopted the Southern German Nuremberg town rights, rather than the Magdeburg rights.

See also
 Danzig law
 German town law
 Kulm law
 Lübeck law

References

External links 
 

 
History of Magdeburg
Legal history of the Holy Roman Empire
Legal history of Poland
Urban planning in Germany